This article lists all power stations in Senegal. In 2012, 85 percent of Senegal's energy came from oil and diesel-fired plants, 11 percent from hydroelectric power and 3 percent from gas.

Thermal

Wind

See also
 List of power stations in Africa
 List of largest power stations in the world
 Energy in Senegal

References

External links
Wärtsilä To Expand Two Power Plants In Senegal

Senegal
 
Power stations